Costapex levis is a species of sea snail, a marine gastropod mollusk, in the family Costellariidae, the ribbed miters.

Distribution
This species occurs in the following locations:
 Papua New Guinea
 Philippines
 Solomon Islands

References

Costellariidae